Katarína Studeníková (born 2 September 1972) is a former professional Slovak tennis player. 

Her highest singles ranking by the Women's Tennis Association (WTA) is 31st, which she reached on 23 December 1996. Her career-high in doubles was at 62, set on 13 November 1995. Studeníková defeated Monica Seles in Wimbledon in the year 1996.

ITF finals

Singles (7–2)

Doubles (2–9)

External links
 
 
 

1972 births
Living people
Slovak female tennis players
Tennis players from Bratislava
Czechoslovak female tennis players
20th-century Slovak women